CTTA may refer to:

 Chinese Table Tennis Association, the Chinese table tennis sport governing body
 Cheltenham Table Tennis Association, the governing body of the Cheltenham table tennis league in the UK
 California Tow Truck Association, the largest state towing association in the United States